Grace College (formerly Joseph Swan School, then Joseph Swan Academy) is a mixed secondary school with academy status situated in south Gateshead, England which educates pupils ages 11–18. The school was originally named after the English physicist and chemist, Sir Joseph Wilson Swan. In 2001, the school was awarded Specialist Technology College status. In April 2019, Joseph Swan Academy was formally bought by Emmanuel Schools Foundation and Mr Mark Hall became principal of the academy, with Nat Ogborn 
becoming its Head of School in 2021. As part of its transition into the ESF, it became known as Grace College from September 2019.

About
It was formed in 1996 as a merger of the Breckenbeds Junior High and Heathfield Senior High schools.

As of 2006, the headteacher was Alan Fuller.  Average annual enrolment is 1,300 pupils. The annual enrolment for year 2007/2008 is of 1460 pupils, including Sixth formers.

As of March 2012, Joseph Swan School became Joseph Swan Academy.

The school also provides a range of after school projects and activities. As of March 2007 the school has an operative Royal Artillery detachment part of Durham Army Cadet Force. The School Detachment is part of 5th Platoon in B Company. The detachment at the moment has 42 cadets enrolled and as of March 2008 anybody who does not go to Joseph Swan Academy may join.

As well as the Royal Artillery detachment, the School are host to the Academy Band of the Band and Bugles of Durham Army Cadet Force which welcomes any new musicians aged 12–18.

In April 2019, Joseph Swan Academy joined the Emmanuel Schools Foundation. As part of the school joining ESF, it has been renamed Grace College.

Notable former pupils
 Andy Carroll
 Paul Gascoigne attended the former Breckenbeds Junior High, which was later merged into the Joseph Swan School
 Scott Fenwick
 Liam Henderson who played in the same school team as Fenwick
Hayden Coulson
James Johnston

References

External links
 
 Ofsted Reports

Secondary schools in Gateshead
Academies in Gateshead
Emmanuel Schools Foundation